Tullamore is the county town of County Offaly in Ireland. It is on the Grand Canal, in the middle of the county, and is the fourth most populous town in the midlands region, with 14,607 inhabitants at the 2016 census.

The town retained Gold Medal status in the National Tidy Town Awards in 2015 and also played host to the World Sheep Dog Trials in 2005, which attracted international interest in the region. The Tullamore Show is held near the town every year. The town's most famous export is Tullamore Dew – an Irish whiskey distilled by Tullamore Distillery – that can be traced back to 1829. The original distillery was shut down in 1954. The brand was later resurrected, but at first was produced at the Midleton Distillery in Cork. However, in 2014, the brand's new owners, William Grant & Sons, invested in a new distillery near Tullamore, bringing whiskey production back to the town.

History 

In the Middle Ages, Tullamore was within the Gaelic territory of Firceall ruled by the O'Molloy clan. Firceall was part of the Kingdom of Meath. The Tullamore area was part of the first English plantations in Ireland during the 1550s when land was confiscated from the native Irish and colonized with English settlers. Firceall was divided into the baronies of Ballycowan, Ballyboy and Eglish, with Tullamore located in Ballycowan.

The Tullamore area, comprising some 5,000 acres, was granted by the English to Sir John Moore in 1622. At that time the Tullamore estate included a ruined castle, ten cottages and two water mills. Sir Robert Forth, who leased the lands from Thomas Moore (son and heir of Sir John), built a mansion house c.1641 in what is now the Charleville demesne. Charles Moore, Lord Tullamore, grandson of Thomas, eventually regained possession of the estate and when he died in 1674 it went via his sister to Charles William Bury. Charles William was later (1806) created the 1st Earl of Charleville in a second creation of the title.

On 10 May 1785, the town was seriously damaged when the crash of a hot air balloon resulted in a fire that burned down as many as 130 homes, giving the town the distinction of being the location of the world's first known aviation disaster. To this day, the town shield depicts a phoenix rising from the ashes. The event is yearly commemorated by the Phoenix festival which celebrates Tullamore's resurrection from the ashes following the accident.

The Grand Canal linked Tullamore to Dublin in 1798. During the Napoleonic Wars, a clash between troops of the King's German Legion and a regiment of British Light Infantry who were both stationed in the town, became known as the Battle of Tullamore. Tullamore became county town of County Offaly in 1835, replacing Daingean.

Tullamore has a long history of whiskey distilling, with two distilleries known to have operated in the town in the 1780s, though closed some years later. Subsequently, a new distillery was established by Michael Molloy, on the site of one of the old distilleries in 1829. When Molloy died, the distillery first passed to his brother Anthony, before eventually making its way into the hands of his nephew, Bernard Daly. When Daly died, his son, Captain Bernard Daly took ownership of the business. With an estate in Terenure, Captain Daly left the day-to-day running of the business to Daniel E. Williams, the distillery's general manager, under whose careful watch the distillery grew and prospered, and launched Tullamore Dew, the whiskey which bears his initials.  Williams brought electricity to Tullamore in 1893. The distillery installed the town's first telephones and introduced motorised transport.  Williams ran various commercial businesses throughout the Irish midlands – drinks businesses, tea importing, seed and grain retail, and a network of 26 general stores.

Following this period, Prohibition in the United States, an economic war with Britain in the 1930s, and World War II all harmed the industry. Tullamore was one of many Irish distilleries affected by a general decline in Irish whiskey sales worldwide. After World War II, Desmond Williams, grandson of Daniel E. Williams, used modern marketing techniques to re-establish Irish whiskey in world markets. In 1947, Desmond Williams also developed Irish Mist, an Irish liqueur made from a blend of whiskey, herbs and honey, using a recipe alleged to have disappeared in the late 17th century and to have been rediscovered in a manuscript 250 years later. Williams also capitalised on the Irish coffee concept, and promoted blended whiskeys along with Tullamore Dew.

Culture 

The Tullamore Phoenix Festival was an annual celebration of art, culture and heritage first held in August between 2000 and 2007. Festival events included hot air balloons, concerts, street entertainment, a parade, and fireworks.

The Queen of the Land Festival takes place in Tullamore each year on the second weekend in November. Primarily a personality contest, it seeks to find the best examples of a modern Irish woman. It is organised by Offaly Macra Na Feirme. Each year about 25 girls between the age of 17 and 35 compete to be crowned Queen of the Land. The festival provides a host of entertainment throughout the town over the weekend, primarily at night.

An annual Tullamore Show takes place on the second Sunday of August every year. It was cancelled in 2007 and 2008 due to heavy rain, though it ran again in 2009. Agriculture was originally the show's main focus, but this has broadened to include entertainment, food, crafts, lifestyle, trade stands, food and refreshments, fashion and entertainment.

Hugh Lynch's Pub on Kilbride Street has been operating as a public house since the early 1800s. In the early 1900s it was bought by the Williams Group, founders of the D.E. Williams Distillery, and run as a public bar and grocery, along with many other outlets in the Irish Midlands, from which they sold their growing whiskey brand "Tullamore Dew". It has been in the Lynch Family since 1971.

The national Fleadh Ceoil was held in Tullamore for the very first time in August 2007. It returned in 2008 and returned for the third time from 21 to 23 August 2009.

The National Ploughing Championships, Europe's largest Outdoor Exhibition and Agriculture Trade Show, was held in Screggan, Tullamore in 2016. The total attendance figures for the 2016 Championship came to a record-breaking 283,000. The show returned to Screggan in September 2017.

Places of interest 

The Tullamore Dew Visitor Centre on the banks of the Grand Canal focuses on the distilling, canal and urban history of the town. Audio visual and self-guided tours are available.

Charleville Estate is located on the edge of the town. One of Ireland's most splendid Gothic buildings, Charleville Castle, stands in this parkland setting which contains the King Oak, one of the biggest and oldest oak trees in the country. The castle is said to be haunted and was featured on series 1 of Living TV's Most Haunted. The oak woodland is botanically an important survivor of primeval stock. The park was the location of the annual Tullamore Agricultural Show. However following the cancellation of the show for two consecutive years due to heavy rainfall the event was moved to a new location with improved drainage in the Blue Ball area, south of the town.

Tullamore is used as a base for the Slieve Bloom Mountains to the south of the county.

Just south of Tullamore are the unique 'Lough Boora' parklands. The boglands are a landscape for a wide range of flora and fauna. The wetlands and wildlife wilderness of Lough Boora now hosts some of the most innovative land and environmental sculptures in Ireland. The artists, inspired by the rich natural and industrial legacy of the boglands, have created a series of large-scale sculptures that are now part of the environmental sculpture park Sculpture in the Parklands. 

10  km west of Tullamore is the village of Rahan. The remains of what was once a large monastery settlement founded by St.Carthage or Mochuda in the 6th century, can be seen in the village.

Within 5 minutes drive is the Celtic cross of Durrow. In the middle of the 6th century, a monastery was founded here by Saint Columba. The monastery is famous for an illuminated manuscript, written here in the 7th century, known as the Book of Durrow. 

There are four metal sculptures located on the N52 Tullamore bypass funded under the percentage for arts scheme where 1% of the budget is allocated to roadside art. Sculptor Maurice Harron created the figures presenting symbols of learning and sanctity.  From the north the 1st figure holds up a chalice, the 2nd a book, the 3rd a crosier and the 4th shows the release of a flock of birds representing souls.  The figures are located on esker ridges that the new roadway cuts through.

There are also a number of churches in the town, including Tullamore Catholic Church, Tullamore Presbyterian Church and St. Catherine's Church of Ireland church.

Economy 

As the county town of Offaly, many government services are located here such as the headquarters of Offaly County Council, the Midlands Regional Hospital and HSE services. Government departments located in the town include the Department of Agriculture, Food and the Marine and the Department of Education and Skills.

Tullamore has traditionally been an important industrial, retail and services centre for County Offaly. When the Grand Canal opened in the late 18th century, it offered increased connectivity to the town and offered an increased market for goods produced in the area. Tullamore Dew, a brand of Irish Whiskey was first distilled in the town in 1829. Tullamore was connected to the national railway network in 1854 by the Great Southern and Western Railway company, now Iarnród Éireann. Tullamore is also located near the boglands of the Bog of Allen. This provided employment through the work of Bord na Mona. Agriculture is also important to the local economy.

A number of industrial estates are located in the town. For example, in Srah Industrial Estate, employers include multinationals like Sennheiser, GeneMedix, Covidien, Isotron and Zannini.

Retail 
The Bridge Centre, is one of the main shopping areas in the town centre, with shops including Dunnes Stores, Vero Moda, and Holland and Barrett. The Tullamore Retail Park on the Portarlington Road also has a mix of shops including Tesco, Heatons, Petmania, Harry Corry and Woodie's DIY. In September 2016, Boots opened in the town centre. This is the largest outlet outside of Dublin city centre and Cork.

Media 

From 1975 until 24 March 2008 Tullamore was the home of RTÉ Radio 1's principal medium-wave transmitter, broadcasting the AM version of Radio 1 on 567 kHz, at a power of 500 kW. Before this, the main transmission centre had been sited near Athlone. Tullamore is also home to the headquarters of Midlands 103. It is home to a number of local newspapers including The Tullamore Tribune and The Offaly Independent.

Tullamore features in several books by the best-selling author Lyn Andrews.

Demographics 

The population of Tullamore (and its environs) rose by 28.8% from 1996 to 2006 from 10,029 to 12,927. The population, of the 2011 census, was 14,361.

Transport and access 

Tullamore railway station, first opened on 2 October 1854, is served by trains on the Dublin-Galway and Dublin-Westport/Ballina inter-city routes.

In association with the County Westmeath urban centres, Athlone and Mullingar, Tullamore forms part of what is known as the Midlands Gateway.

Tullamore lies on the N52 national secondary road. This connects to Birr in the southwest of the county and continues towards Mullingar which is located to the northeast. At Kilbeggan (about 12 km north of Tullamore) the N52 forms an interchange with the M6 motorway which connects Dublin and Galway. The N80 national secondary road connects Tullamore with Killeigh, Mountmellick and Portlaoise, travelling in a southwards direction. A number of regional roads run through the town such as the R420 connecting Tullamore to Moate, Clara and Portarlington, and the R421 which connects to Kinnitty.

N52 Tullamore Bypass 
In 2009, Tullamore was bypassed by re-routing the N52 away from the town centre. A spur was constructed from the northern section of the route to the Tullamore Western Relief Road R443 creating in an almost-full orbital route around Tullamore. The N80 now terminates at its junction with the N52. The scheme began construction in April 2008, and was officially opened in late 2009 by then Taoiseach Brian Cowen.

Sport 
Tullamore has a number of sporting organisations, including Gaelic games, association football, rugby union and athletics clubs.

Gaelic games are represented by Tullamore GAA, Ballinamere GAA and Durrow GAA. Tullamore GAA won four senior football championships and one senior hurling championship in the early 21st century. Between football and hurling championships, Tullamore is the most successful club in the history of Offaly GAA. Ballinamere won the intermediate hurling championship in 2013, and therefore play senior hurling along with Tullamore. Durrow partakes in the senior 'B' football championship. O'Connor Park is the Offaly GAA home stadium for both the Offaly Gaelic football and hurling teams. The stadium has a capacity of 20,000 following an upgrade in 2006. The ground consists of a covered stand on one side of the pitch, with terracing on the other three. A stand was built in 1991 but replaced by the current structure in 2006. It seats 7,000 people and also includes a press box and a special section for wheelchair users.

Association football (soccer) is represented by Tullamore Town F.C. This club was founded in 1941 and have teams in the Leinster Senior League, Combined Counties League (2nd team Women's and Youths) and the Midland Schoolboys League.

Tullamore Rugby Club was founded in 1937 and is based in Spollenstown. The Tullamore 1sts team was successful in 2012 as Ulster Bank All Ireland Jnr Cup Champions.

Tullamore Harriers caters for athletics in the town, and was founded in 1953.

Other leisure facilities include the Aura Leisure Centre Tullamore, located on Hophill Road, which has a full gym suite and a 25-metre swimming pool. Tullamore Golf Club has been situated at Brookfield since 1926 and has an 18-hole championship parkland golf course. It was rated among the top 25 parkland courses in Ireland in Backspin's 2014 Irish Golf Course Rankings.

Education 

Tullamore has several primary schools. There are several Catholic schools, a Church of Ireland school, a Gaelscoil and an Educate Together school. There are three secondary schools in the town; Tullamore College, a coeducational, multidenominational vocational school, the Sacred Heart School, a Catholic all-girls school and Coláiste Choilm, a Catholic all-boys school.

People 

Notable current and former residents of Tullamore include:
 Conor Brady, former editor of The Irish Times
 Yvonne Farrell (born 1951), architect
 Gerald Gardner (1922–2009), geophysicist and social activist whose statistical analysis led to the banning of classified advertising segregated by gender in a 1973 ruling by the US Supreme Court
Michael Kelly (1929-2021), Jesuit missionary active in the fight against AIDS in Zambia
 Alfie Lambe (1932–1959), missionary and founder of Legion of Mary in South America
 Dónal Lunny (born 1947), traditional Irish musician and performer
 James Nolan (born 1977), middle-distance athlete, silver medallist at the 2000 European Indoor Championships
 Sister Genevieve O'Farrell (1923–2001), Irish educator and college principal
 Tom Scully (1930–2020), priest and manager of the county football team
 Pat Burke, the first Irish-born player to play basketball in the NBA.

Gallery

See also 

 List of towns and villages in Ireland
 Market Houses in Ireland

References

External links 

 Tullamore
 Tullamore Chamber
 Tullamore Show
 Architecture of Tullamore

 
County towns in the Republic of Ireland
Towns and villages in County Offaly